In 2018, following the 2017 Læsø Municipal election, Danish People's Party and the Social Democrats (Denmark) reached an agreement for a constitution that would see Karsten Nielsen, from Danish People's Party become the first mayor in a Danish municipality, in the party's history.
On June 4, 2021, Karsten Nielsen announced he would switch his party affiliation to centre-right Venstre. 
Later on 9 October 2021, he announced he would not stand to be re-elected for mayor. Instead deputy mayor, Tobias Birch, would be the main candidate of Venstre.

Electoral system
For elections to Danish municipalities, a number varying from 9 to 31 are chosen to be elected to the municipal council. The seats are then allocated using the D'Hondt method and a closed list proportional representation.
Læsø Municipality had 9 seats in 2021

Unlike in Danish General Elections, in elections to municipal councils, electoral alliances are allowed.

Electoral alliances 

Electoral Alliance 1

Electoral Alliance 2

Results

2021 Læsø Municipal election

References

Læsø